Hunt Valley station is a Baltimore Light Rail station located at the Hunt Valley Towne Centre shopping complex in Hunt Valley, Maryland. The station opened in 1997 as the terminus of a northern extension of the Light Rail system. It has a single island platform serving two tracks, which continue east of the platform as tail tracks.

References

External links

MTA Maryland - Light Rail stations
Station on Google Maps Street View

Baltimore Light Rail stations
Hunt Valley, Maryland
Railway stations in Baltimore County, Maryland
1997 establishments in Maryland
Railway stations in the United States opened in 1997